Belver Dam is a concrete gravity dam on the Tagus, where the river forms the border line between the Portuguese districts of Portalegre and Santarém. It is located in the municipality Gavião, in Portalegre District.

Construction of the dam began in 1945. The dam was completed in 1952. It is owned by HIDROTEJO.

Dam
The volume of the dam is 90,000 m³. The spillway is part of the dam body (10 roller gates with a maximum discharge capacity of 18,000 m³/s).

Reservoir
The active capacity is 8.5 (7.5) mio. m³.

Power plant 
The run-of-the-river hydroelectric power plant went operational in 1951. It is operated by EDP. The plant has a nameplate capacity of 80.7 (80) MW. Its average annual generation is 220 (176, 180 or 239) GWh.

The power station contains six Kaplan turbine-generators in a dam powerhouse. The machines 1 to 5 have vertical shafts, whereas machine 6 has a horizontal shaft.

See also

 List of power stations in Portugal
 List of dams and reservoirs in Portugal

References

Dams in Portugal
Hydroelectric power stations in Portugal
Gravity dams
Dams completed in 1952
Energy infrastructure completed in 1952
1952 establishments in Portugal
Buildings and structures in Portalegre District
Dams on the Tagus
Run-of-the-river power stations